John J. Ruka (May 30, 1862 – December 19, 1928) was a member of the Wisconsin State Assembly.

Biography
Ruka was born on May 30, 1862 in Boscobel, Wisconsin. He married Martha Fox. By trade, he was a manufacturer and a farmer. Ruka died on December 19, 1928.

Political career
Ruka was elected to the Assembly in 1916 and 1918. In addition, he was a member of the city council and school board of Boscobel. He was a Republican.

References

External links

Wisconsin Historical Society

People from Boscobel, Wisconsin
Businesspeople from Wisconsin
Farmers from Wisconsin
Republican Party members of the Wisconsin State Assembly
Wisconsin city council members
School board members in Wisconsin
1862 births
1928 deaths
Burials in Wisconsin